"Everybody Is in the Place" is a song by Dutch DJ Hardwell.

Background 
A music video consisting of fan footage shot for the song was uploaded by Hardwell. The song became Revealed Recordings' 100th released single.

Track listing

Charts

References 

2014 songs
2014 singles
Hardwell songs
Songs written by Hardwell